Junctophilin 4 is a protein in humans that is encoded by the JPH4 gene.

This gene encodes a member of the junctophilin family of transmembrane proteins that are involved in the formation of the junctional membrane complexes between the plasma membrane and the endoplasmic/sarcoplasmic reticulum in excitable cells. The encoded protein contains a conserved N-terminal repeat region called the membrane occupation and recognition nexus sequence that is found in other members of the junctophilin family. Alternative splicing results in multiple transcript variants. [provided by RefSeq, Mar 2009].

References

Further reading 

Genes on human chromosome 14